Local elections were held in Jordan on 27 August 2003 to elect held municipal and local councils.

See also
Municipal council
Local council

References

2013 in Jordan
2013
2013 elections in Asia